This is a list of members of the Victorian Legislative Assembly as elected at the 1 June 1904 election and subsequent by-elections up to the election of 15 March 1907.

Note the "Term in Office" refers to that members term(s) in the Assembly, not necessarily for that electorate.

Thomas Bent was Premier, Treasurer and Minister for Railways.
Frank Madden was Speaker, Albert Craven was Chairman of Committees.

 Ewen Cameron (MLA Glenelg) died 30 March 1906; replaced by Hugh Campbell in May 1906.
 Fairbairn resigned in September 1906 to contest the Federal seat of Fawkner; replaced by Norman Bayles October 1906.
 Gillott resigned December 1907; replaced by Henry Weedon in January 1907.
 Irvine resigned in June 1906 to take the Federal seat of Flinders; replaced by Robert Stanley in July 1906.
 Levien died 24 May 1906; replaced by James Farrer in June 1906.

References

 Re-member (a database of all Victorian MPs since 1851). Parliament of Victoria.

Members of the Parliament of Victoria by term
20th-century Australian politicians